Mohd Radzi bin Md Jidin (Jawi: محمد راضي بن محمد جيدين‎; born 4 September 1977) is a Malaysian politician and forensic accountant who served as Senior Minister of the Education and Social Cluster and as Minister of Education from 2020 to 2022. He has been the Member of Parliament (MP) for Putrajaya since November 2022.

He was a Senator from 2018 to his resignation in 2022. He is a member of and has served as Vice-President of the Malaysian United Indigenous Party (BERSATU), a component party of Perikatan Nasional (PN), since 2020.

Early life 
Radzi was born on 4 September 1977 to a former headmaster in Ketereh, Kota Bharu, Kelantan. Before joining politics, he was a lecturer in forensic accounting at University of Tasmania in Hobart, Australia.

Political career 
He contested in the 2018 general election for Ketereh federal seat in Kelantan against incumbent Annuar Musa from UMNO of BN and Wan Ismail Wan Jusoh from the Malaysian Islamic Party (PAS) but was defeated.

He served as the Deputy Minister of Economic Affairs in the Pakatan Harapan (PH) administration under former Prime Minister Mahathir Mohamad and former Minister Mohamed Azmin Ali from July 2018 to the collapse of the PH administration in February 2020. He is a member of the Malaysian United Indigenous Party (BERSATU), which is a component party of the opposition PN coalition. BERSATU was formerly a component party of the PH coalition prior to the 2020–2022 Malaysian political crisis. Before joining BERSATU, Radzi was a member of the United Malays National Organisation (UMNO), a component party of the Barisan Nasional (BN) coalition.

Election results

Honour
  :
  Knight Commander of the Order of the Territorial Crown (PMW) – Datuk (2021)

References

Living people
1977 births
People from Kelantan
Malaysian people of Malay descent
Malaysian Muslims
Malaysian accountants
Malaysian academics
Education ministers of Malaysia
Malaysian United Indigenous Party politicians
Former United Malays National Organisation politicians
Government ministers of Malaysia
Members of the Dewan Negara
21st-century Malaysian politicians